The 12th Meril Prothom Alo Awards ceremony, presented by Prothom Alo took place on April 9, 2010, at the Bangabandhu International Conference Center in Dhaka, Bangladesh as a part of 2009-10 film awards season.

Awards and winners
A total of 12 awards were given at the ceremony. Following is the list of the winners:

Lifetime Achievement Award - 2010
 Renowned singer of Nazrul song Shudhin Das

Public Choice Awards - 2009

Critic's Choice Awards - 2009

Special Critics' Award - 2009
 Topu - Third Person Singular Number

Presenters and performances

Presenters

Performances

See also
 National Film Awards
 Bachsas Awards
 Babisas Award

References

External links

Meril-Prothom Alo Awards ceremonies
2009 film awards
2010 awards in Bangladesh
2010 in Dhaka
April 2010 events in Bangladesh